Saint Emilianus of Trevi, sometimes known as Miliano (died 304), was a 4th-century bishop of Trevi, martyred under Diocletian.

Life
An account of his life is given in the Passio Sancti Miliani.

Emilianus came to Spoleto from Armenia at the end of the 3rd century. He was consecrated bishop by Pope Marcellinus and sent to Trevi.

Under the Persecution of Diocletian he was subjected to innumerable tortures and was eventually put to death on 28 January 304 together with three companions. He was decapitated three kilometres from Trevi, at Bovara, then a pagan holy place, bound to an olive tree (which is said still to exist).

Cult
Emilianus is the patron of Trevi, of which he was the first bishop. The relics had been forgotten (possibly stolen or hidden during the Middle Ages) but were rediscovered in 1660 during restoration work on Spoleto Cathedral, where they are still preserved.

His feast day is 28 January. The celebrations, going back to remote antiquity, were formerly very solemn, comprising many different events both sacred and secular, of which the most important is the striking nocturnal procession, the Processione dell’Illuminata, held on the evening of the vigil of the feast (27 January).

The saint is also venerated at Ripa in Perugia where his feast in celebrated on the Sunday closest to 28 January.

Notes and references

External links 
Santi e Beati: Sant'Emiliano di Trevi 

Armenian saints
People from the Province of Perugia
304 deaths
4th-century Christian saints
Saints from Roman Italy
Bishops in Umbria
4th-century Christian martyrs
Year of birth missing
Christians martyred during the reign of Diocletian